Royal Air Force (RAF) Podington  is a former Royal Air Force station in northern Bedfordshire, England,  south-east of Wellingborough, Northamptonshire.

History
Podington airfield was originally built between 1940 and 1941 to accommodate two Royal Air Force (RAF) bomber squadrons.

USAAF use
On 18 April 1942 it was made available to the United States Army Air Forces (USAAF) 8th Air Force.

Podington was assigned USAAF Station Number 109.

28th Troop Carrier Squadron
The first USAAF unit to use Podington was the 28th Troop Carrier Squadron in June 1942, arriving from Westover Army Air Field, Massachusetts. The 20th was part of the 60th Troop Carrier Group, based at RAF Chelveston.

The 28th TCS flew Douglas C-47 Skytrains from the base until rejoining the 60th at RAF Aldermaston in August.

15th Bombardment Squadron (Light)

The 15th Bombardment Squadron, arrived on 15 September 1942 from RAF Molesworth, flying the British Boston III light bomber. The 15th was originally part of the 27th Bombardment Group (Light), based in the Philippine Islands, however the group's planes (A-24's), did not arrive by 7 December 1941. Due to the deteriorating situation in the Philippines after the Japanese attack, they were diverted to Australia where they reformed into a combat unit and fought in the Dutch East Indies and New Guinea Campaigns.

From Molesworth, the squadron joined with six RAF crews from RAF Swanton Morley for a low-level attack on Luftwaffe airfields in the Netherlands on 4 July. At Podington, the 15th BS later acquired its own USAAF Douglas A-20 Havocs
and flew a number of missions with RAF Bomber Command.   In October,  was transferred to Twelfth Air Force for support of Allied landings in North Africa, being assigned to Ste-Barbe-du-Tlelat Airfield, Algeria on 26 December 1942, Its crews were absorbed by the 47th Bombardment Group (Light), and the 15th was inactivated.

8th Bomber Command Combat Crew Replacement Unit
The VII BC CCRU moved almost immediately to Podington in August 1942. The unit remained until May 1943 processing personnel into the UK, then assigning them as replacements to various 8th AF groups in East Anglia.

301st Bombardment Group (Heavy)
From 15 August through 2 September 1942, Podington was briefly used by the 301st Bombardment Group, based at RAF Chelveston as a satellite airfield for its Boeing B-17 Flying Fortress bombers.

It was quickly found that Podington was inadequate to support the B-17s and required improvement to Class A airfield standards. As a result, the runways at Podington were lengthened to accommodate the heavy 4-engined bombers of the Eighth Air Force. Topographical limitations, however, resulted in the NE-SW runway being only 1100 yards, giving Podington an exceptionally short secondary runway.  Additional hardstands and taxiways were also constructed.

100th Bombardment Group (Heavy)
In early June 1943, the 100th Bombardment Group, Heavy arrived at Podington from Kearney AAF Nebraska.   However the group only stayed for less than a week (2–8 June) before moving on to RAF Thorpe Abbotts in East Anglia.

92nd Bombardment Group (Heavy)
Podington remained vacant until 23 September when the 92nd Bombardment Group (Heavy) moved into Podington from RAF Alconbury to allow the 482nd Bomb Group to be formed there.  The 92nd was the oldest group in the 8th Air Force, having been the first USAAF bomber group to make the transatlantic crossing to the UK in July 1942.

The 92nd Bomb Group was known as "Fame's Favored Few", and it was assigned to the 40th Combat Wing, at RAF Thurleigh.  The group tail code was a "Triangle B". Its operational squadrons were:
 325th Bombardment Squadron (NV)
 326th Bombardment Squadron (JW)
 327th Bombardment Squadron (UX)
 407th Bombardment Squadron (PY)

From Podington, the group flew almost 300 operational missions over Nazi-Occupied Europe. Missions were flown to Wilhelmshaven, a tire plant at Hanover, airfields near Paris, an aircraft factory at Nantes, and a magnesium mine and reducing plant in Norway.

Although handicapped by weather conditions, enemy fire, and insufficient fighter protection, the 92nd bombed aircraft factories in central Germany on 11 January 1944 and received a Distinguished Unit Citation for the mission.

The group took part in the intensive campaign of heavy bombers against the German aircraft industry during Big Week, 20–25 February 1944. After that, it attacked V-weapon sites in France; airfields in France, Germany, and the Low Countries, and industrial targets in France, Germany, and Belgium, making concentrated strikes on oil and transportation facilities after October 1944.

In addition to strategic missions, the 92nd performed some interdictory and support operations, assisting the Normandy invasion in June 1944 by hitting gun emplacements, junctions, and marshalling yards in the beachhead area, supporting ground forces at Saint-Lô during the breakthrough in July 1944, bombing gun positions and bridges to aid the airborne assault on the Netherlands in September 1944, participating in the Battle of the Bulge, December 1944-January 1945, by attacking bridges and marshalling yards in and near the battle area and bombing airfields near the landing zone to cover the airborne assault across the Rhine in March 1945.

After V-E Day, the 92nd Bomb Group Moved to Istres Air Base, France in June 1945 where the unit transported troops from Marseilles to Casablanca for return to the United States. The group was inactivated in France on 28 February 1946 where the personnel demobilized and B-17 aircraft were sent to storage.

Medal of Honor
92d Bombardment Group Flight Officer John C. Morgan, co-pilot, received the Medal of Honor for action aboard a B-17 during a mission over Europe on 26 July 1943. His aircraft was attacked by enemy fighters, the pilot suffered a brain injury which left him in a crazed condition. For two hours Morgan flew in formation with one hand at the controls and the other holding off the struggling pilot who was attempting to fly the plane. Finally another crew member was able to relieve the situation and the B-17 made a safe landing at Podington.

Legacy

During the Cold War the 92d was a major wing under various designations in the United States Air Force Strategic Air Command. The 92d Bombardment Wing, Very Heavy was organized and activated on 17 November 1947 at Spokane (later Fairchild) AFB where it has been on active duty for almost 60 years.  The wing deployed Boeing B-29 Stratofortress aircraft to Far East Air Forces during Korean War, where in 1950 it engaged in combat operations flying propeller-driven bomber aircraft against enemy MiG-15 jet fighter aircraft.

The 92d Bombardment Wing, Heavy was bestowed the honors and history of the USAAF 92d Bombardment Group in 1952. Returning from Korea, the wing was equipped with the Consolidated B-36 "Peacemaker" aircraft, later the Boeing B-52 "Stratofortresses", and stood nuclear alert during the Cold War years of the 1950s and early 1960s. The wing also supported SAC combat operations in the Vietnam War from 1968-1973.

During the post Cold War era, the 92d Wing was a major B-52H bomber wing of the new Air Combat Command during 1992-94.  Redesignated as the 92d Air Refueling Wing in 1994, the wing was assigned to Air Mobility Command as a very large KC-135 tanker wing.

The 92d ARW is currently on active duty.

479th Antisubmarine Group
The ground echelon of the Army Air Forces Antisubmarine Command 479th Antisubmarine Group moved to Podington in November 1943 after its air echelon was inactivated at RAF Dunkeswell in Devon.  From Podington the groups ground echelons of its headquarters and attached operational squadrons were reassigned to various Eighth Air Force units as replacements and the group being disbanded on 11 November.

Air Ministry use
The USAAF returned Podington to the RAF in July 1945 and the airfield was retained by the Air Ministry for storage. As late as 1960, Ministry of Defence personnel were assigned to Podington looking after several million sandbags.

In 1961, a public inquiry was made by a Member of Parliament with regards to the need by the MoD to maintain millions of Second World War sandbags, and the outcome of the investigation was the sale of Podington to private interests later that year.

Current use
With the end of military control, some demolition and concrete removal was performed in the early 1960s, however before all the airfield was ground into aggregate, a group of drag-racing enthusiasts approached the owners to use the main runway as a drag racing strip. In 1964 an agreement was reached for what became Santa Pod Raceway, which opened during Easter weekend, 1966.

In 1972, the concrete was resurfaced with asphalt and Santa Pod became a major European centre for drag racing.

Some of the buildings in the old Technical Site remain, though most have succumbed to vandalism or demolition. The two main T-2 hangars are gone - one was dismantled and the other lost in a fire.  The old control tower is one of the few to have been converted into an unusual private house. Those buildings that remain are generally in use by local businesses though some are derelict. The old HQ and Operations Block in particular has seen recent use as a stables, and is not in the best of condition. The perimeter track remains in many places, though reduced in width, and the runways have long since gone (with the exception of the portion now in use as a drag racing track).

Podington may yet serve the nation once again - there is a proposal by Nuon Renewables to build nine wind turbines (downgraded from the original proposal of 15) on the old airfield site, though this is running into significant local opposition - as is usually the case with proposed windfarms. The proposed windfarm would generate electricity for 10,000 local homes.

RAF Podington unit emblems

See also

 List of former Royal Air Force stations

References

Citations

Bibliography

 Ravenstein, Charles A. (1984). Air Force Combat Wings Lineage and Honors Histories 1947-1977. Maxwell AFB, Alabama: Office of Air Force History. .
 Rogers, Brian (2005). United States Air Force Unit Designations Since 1978. Hinkley, England: Midland Publications. .
 USAAS-USAAC-USAAF-USAF Aircraft Serial Numbers—1908 to present

External links

 60th Troop Carrier Group
 301st Bombardment Group
 15th Bombardment Squadron
 100th Bombardment Group
 92nd Bombardment Group
 Historic Podington photo gallery
 United States Army Air Forces - Podington

Airfields of the VIII Bomber Command in the United Kingdom
Royal Air Force stations in Bedfordshire
Royal Air Force stations of World War II in the United Kingdom